Daniel Crombie Bew (1896 – 1951) was an English footballer. He played in The Football League for Hull City and Swindon Town.

References

English footballers
Sunderland A.F.C. players
Swindon Town F.C. players
Hull City A.F.C. players
English Football League players
1896 births
1951 deaths
Association football defenders